This is a list of the bus routes operated by various bus operators in and around Kuala Lumpur and Selangor, Malaysia. 

Dates and times stated in the tables are according to Malaysia Time (MST) (UTC+08:00) as of 1 December 2015.

As of 2021, there are 8 bus corridors in Kuala Lumpur:

Jalan Ipoh Corridor
This corridors mainly serve Kepong, Sentul and Gombak areas as well as Kuala Selangor and Rawang areas.

Jalan Pahang Corridor
This corridors mainly serve Melawati, Gombak, Wangsa Maju, Danau Kota and Keramat areas, and the only corridor to operate fully by Rapid KL buses.

Ampang Corridor
This corridors mainly serve Ampang areas.

Cheras Corridor
This corridor mainly serve Cheras, Maluri, Kajang and Bangi areas. Most areas were operated by MRT Feeder buses.

Sungai Besi Corridor
This corridors mainly serve Sungai Besi, Seri Kembangan, Serdang, Putrajaya and Cyberjaya areas.

Jalan Klang Lama Corridor
This route mainly serve Petaling and Puchong areas.

Federal Highway Corridor
This corridor mostly serve Subang, Kelana Jaya, Shah Alam, Klang and Banting areas.

Damansara Corridor 
This corridor serve Damansara, Bandar Utama and Solaris areas.

Ceased or unknown operation 
This were the list of the routes that were temporary suspended, unknown status, not introduced, abandoned or terminated. This may be due to low demand, unreliable routes or taken over by rail systems.

See also
 Prasarana Malaysia
 Public transport in Kuala Lumpur
 Buses in Kuala Lumpur

References

External links
 Rapid KL routes on MyRapid website
 Rapid KL routes on Moovit

Kuala Lumpur bus routes
Bus routes, Kuala Lumpur
Kuala Lumpur
Kuala Lumpur